"Vannski" is a single from Norwegian DJ and electronic music duo Broiler. It was released in Norway on 16 May 2013 for digital download. The song peaked at number 1 on the Norwegian Singles Chart, making it their first number one single in Norway. The song is included on their debut studio album The Beginning (2013)

Track listing

Chart performance

Weekly charts

Release history

References

2013 singles
DJ Broiler songs
Number-one singles in Norway